Amanda Kotze (born 26 February 1986) is a retired South African sprinter who specialized in the 400 metres.

Individually she competed at the 2003 World Youth Championships and the 2004 World Junior Championships, then finished sixth at the 2006 African Championships and competed at the 2007 All-Africa Games without reaching the final.

At the 2004 World Junior Championships she also competed in the 4 × 100 metres and the 4 × 400 metres relay. The team with Kotze as a member also competed in 4 × 400 metres relay at the 2005 World Championships and the 2006 Commonwealth Games, won the gold medal at the 2006 African Championships and silver medal at the 2007 All-Africa Games.

Her personal best time was 52.76 seconds, achieved at the 2007 All-Africa Games.

References

1986 births
Living people
South African female sprinters
Athletes (track and field) at the 2006 Commonwealth Games
Commonwealth Games competitors for South Africa
African Games silver medalists for South Africa
African Games medalists in athletics (track and field)
Athletes (track and field) at the 2007 All-Africa Games
20th-century South African women
21st-century South African women